The Gypsy Baron is a 1954 West German operetta film directed by Arthur Maria Rabenalt and starring Paul Hörbiger, Gerhard Riedmann and Margit Saad. It is an adaptation of the 1885 operetta A cigánybáró by Mór Jókai.

It was shot at the Tempelhof Studios in Berlin and on location in various places in Yugoslavia including Belgrade and Sarajevo. The film's sets were designed by Willi Herrmann, Paul Markwitz, Peter Schlewski and Heinrich Weidemann.

Cast
Paul Hörbiger as Barinkay
Gerhard Riedmann as Sandor
Margit Saad as Saffi
Karl Schönböck as Colonel Homonay
Oskar Sima as Kalman Zsupan
Maria Sebaldt as Arsena
Peer Schmidt as Ottokar
Harald Paulsen as Count Carnero
Karl Finkenzeller as Janos
Trude Hesterberg as Zipra
Gert Kollat as emigrant
Waltraut Haas as Empress Maria Theresa

References

External links

1950s historical musical films
German historical musical films
West German films
Films directed by Arthur Maria Rabenalt
Operetta films
Films shot at Tempelhof Studios
Films based on operettas
Films set in Hungary
Films set in Romania
German multilingual films
Films about Romani people
1950s multilingual films
1950s German films
1950s German-language films